L. Gardner and Sons Ltd was a British builder of diesel engines for stationary, marine, road and rail applications. The company was founded in Hulme, Manchester, England in 1868. It started building engines around 1895. The firm ceased engine production in the mid-1990s.

Origin

About 1868 Lawrence Gardner set up as a sewing machine maker in Upper Duke Street, Stretford Road, Hulme, Manchester. He died in 1890, but the business was continued by his sons under the name L. Gardner & Sons Ltd.

Gas and diesel engines
From about 1895 the company was building gas engines and, in 1899 it moved into Barton Hall Engine Works, Patricroft, Manchester.

In 1903 it became a limited company, L Gardner and Sons Ltd. Norris and Henty Ltd, of London, were appointed as sales agents.

Diesel engine production began in around 1903. In 1912 a new sales subsidiary, Norris, Henty and Gardners Ltd, was formed.

During World War I (1914–1918) the company made munitions and parts for heavy guns and engines for tanks.

Automotive engines
During the 1920s there was rapid development in the design of diesel engines. In 1929 a Gardner "4L2" marine engine was fitted into a Lancia bus. This conversion was successful and prompted Gardner to introduce the "LW" series of diesel engines, designed especially for road vehicles but later modified and supplied as a marine engine with factory-fitted bilge pumps. The LW engine was a modular design, with separate cast iron cylinder blocks and cylinder heads comprising either 2 or 3 cylinders. A 5-cylinder engine would thus use a "2" and a "3", whereas a 6-cylinder engine could have either 3 "2"s or 2 "3"s. Boat engines had a cast iron crankcase, whereas (in the interest of lightness) road vehicles would have an aluminium alloy crankcase. Any boat engine with an alloy crankcase would be a marinised road engine.

During the 1930s a number of LW-series engines (usually 4LWs, but occasionally 6LWs) were installed in large luxury cars including Lagondas, Bentleys and Rolls-Royces. The Gardner engine's reliability and economy (tests showed that even a two-ton Bentley could achieve 30 miles per gallon of fuel while having a top speed of 80 mph), coupled to its remarkable refinement and smooth running abilities, made it the only suitable compression-ignition engine at the time

During World War II (1939–1945) Gardner's war work consisted mainly of building diesel engines of their own design. Their 4LK bus engines were also used as the main powerplant in the Royal Navy's X class and XE class midget submarines.

Post-war diesels

After the war the 'LW' diesel engine continued to be built in large numbers for lorries and buses and was later supplemented by the more modern 'LX'. In the mid-sixties, the LW range was upgraded to develop 20 bhp per cylinder, and known as LW20. The 6LX was upgraded in 1967 from 150 bhp @1700rpm to 180 bhp @1850rpm. An 8-cylinder version was developed which developed 240 bhp @ 1850rpm, and was said to be the smoothest running automotive diesel ever built. The larger '6L3' and '8L3' engines were used in railway locomotives, such as British Rail Class 01 and 04 and also in vessels of up to 120 feet such as MV Havengore, and maxi yachts Condor and Condor of Bermuda.

Takeover and decline
In June 1976, Rolls-Royce acquired a 17% shareholding, but, in December 1977, the business was purchased by Hawker Siddeley.

In the summer of 1986, after months of denials, Perkins Engines purchased Gardner to complement their line of lighter diesel engines. Production was then shut down until October, because Gardner's truck engine market share had slumped precariously, although Gardner's market for buses and coaches was doing better.

L. Gardner and Sons ceased production of new engines in the early 1990s. The introduction of emissions regulations for road-going Gardner diesels would have required the development of significantly modified, or totally new, engine designs, and in the marine market there was a shift away from big, low-speed, high-torque engines such as Gardners, towards adapted high-speed automotive turbodiesels.

Gardner engines
 Gardner 4LK, 60 hp @ 2100 RPM, Natural 4-cylinder diesel, Cylinder capacity: 3,800 cc
 Gardner 4LW, 75 hp @ 1700 RPM, Natural 4-cylinder diesel, Cylinder capacity: 5,580 cc
 Gardner 5LW, 85 hp (later 94 hp) @ 1700 RPM, Natural 5-cylinder diesel, Cylinder capacity: 6,975 cc
 Gardner 6LW 102 hp (later 112 hp) @ 1700 RPM, Natural 6-cylinder diesel, Cylinder capacity: 8,370 cc
 Gardner 6LX, 150 hp @ 1700 RPM, Natural 6-cylinder diesel, Cylinder capacity: 10,450 cc
 Gardner 6LXB, 180 hp @ 1850 RPM, Natural 6-cylinder diesel, Cylinder capacity: 10,450 cc
 Gardner 8LXB, 240 hp @ 1850 RPM, Natural 8-cylinder diesel, Cylinder capacity: 13,933 cc

The 6LXC engine (giving 195 bhp) is not mentioned.
Source

Preservation
The Anson Engine Museum has an extensive collection of historic Gardner engines.

References

Sources
 Smith, Donald H., The Modern Diesel, pp 151–154, published by Iliffe & Sons, London, 13th edition 1959

Further reading
 L. Gardner & Sons Limited: Legendary Engineering Excellence by Graham Edge
 L. Gardner and Sons Limited: the history of a British industrial firm. PhD thesis published 2010 Maurice J. Halton

External links

 Gardner Marine Diesels - Supply, restoration and servicing of Gardner engines, UK.
 MPS Vintage Diesels - Engine restorers and parts manufacturer, UK.
 Mainline Diesel Engineering - Engine restorers and parts supplier, Australia. 

Diesel engine manufacturers
Engine manufacturers of the United Kingdom
Defunct companies based in Manchester
Manufacturing companies based in Manchester
Marine engine manufacturers
Hawker Siddeley
Rolls-Royce